Lisa Gormley (born 29 September 1984) is an English-born Australian actress and best known for playing Bianca Scott on the Channel 7 serial drama Home and Away.  She is a NIDA graduate.

Early life 

Gormley was born in Bradford, West Yorkshire, England and moved to the Barossa Valley in South Australia at age 3 and to a farm in Tasmania at the age of 12.  She is a country girl at heart, Gormley immediately made herself at home spending her formative years on the  property.

At a young age Gormley appeared in youth community theatre with a vivid memory of her first play, which was Oliver.  Gormley's attraction to theatre is that she is an only child and was really excited to have people around her.  Community theatre was how she fell in love with acting.

Education and career 
Gormley attended Woodbridge District High School from 1997 to 2000. She then attended Rosny College in Hobart from 2001 to 2002. She performed as a courtesan in the school's annual stage production of "A Funny Thing Happened on the Way to the Forum" c.2001.

After finishing college, Gormley travelled to the UK where she became a flight attendant for Qantas.

When Gormley returned to Australia she was accepted into NIDA, in which she was involved in technical production, teaching, directing and acting. She graduated at the end of 2009.

Gormley appeared in the 2010 film Before the Rain. That same year, Gormley received the role of Bianca Scott, the sister of April Scott (Rhiannon Fish), in Home and Away. She left the series in 2014 after almost four years. She returned to the role in 2016.

From January to March 2017, Gormley starred in David Williamson's play Odd Man Out at the Ensemble Theatre.

References

External links

 
 

1984 births
Living people
Australian television actresses
English emigrants to Australia
English television actresses
National Institute of Dramatic Art alumni
21st-century Australian actresses
21st-century English actresses
Actresses from Bradford
Actresses from Hobart